Minqin County is a county of Gansu province, the People's Republic of China. It is under the jurisdiction of Wuwei City. Its postal code is 733300, and its population in 1999 was 281,826 people.

In older literature, today's Minqin is referred to as Zhenfan. According to Pyotr Kozlov, the Mongol name for the city was Sogo Khoto.

Geographically, Minqin county occupies one of Gansu's panhandles, bordering in the north, east, and southeast on the Alashan League of Inner Mongolia.

History
Historically, Chinese agricultural settlement in the area was made possible by the Shiyang River, flowing from the Qilian Mountains. However, the livelihood of Chinese farmers here was often precarious; 
in the 1920s it was considered as somewhat of a regular famine district. Large number of Zhenfan people, nicknamed "Sand-hollow Mice", worked as "camel-pullers" with caravans owned by Mongols from the adjacent Alashan, or moved—temporarily or permanently—to Xinjiang. For example, as of 1926, the main population of the small oasis of Santanghu (now, officially, Santanghu in what's today Barkol Kazakh Autonomous County of Xinjiang were migrants from Minqin (Zhenfan) and their descendants.

By the late 20th century, the environmental situation in the Minqin area deteriorated, as smaller amounts of the Shiyang River water reached the area, due to the increased irrigation of use of it upstream. Ground water levels fell, and desertification became a serious threat.
Minqin is now identified as one of the major sources of sandstorms in China.

Climate

Administrative divisions
Minqin County is divided to 18 towns.
Towns

See also
 List of administrative divisions of Gansu

References

  Official website (Chinese)

 
Minqin County
Wuwei, Gansu